The first season of Designing Women premiered on CBS on September 29, 1986, and concluded on May 11, 1987. The season consisted of 22 episodes. Created by Linda Bloodworth-Thomason, the series was produced by Bloodworth/Thomason Mozark Productions in association with Columbia Pictures Television.

The series centers on the lives of four women and one man working together at an interior design firm in Atlanta, Georgia called Sugarbaker & Associates. It originally starred Dixie Carter as Julia Sugarbaker, president of the design firm; Delta Burke as Suzanne Sugarbaker, Julia's ex-beauty queen sister and the design firm's silent partner; Annie Potts as head designer, Mary Jo Shively; and Jean Smart as office manager, Charlene Frazier.

Broadcast history
When the show debuted on CBS' Monday-night lineup in 1986 (9:30 pm, EST) it garnered respectable ratings; however, CBS moved the show several times to other time slots. After dismal ratings on Sunday night and Thursday night time slots, CBS placed it on hiatus and was ready to cancel the show, but a viewer campaign saved the show and returned it to its original Monday night slot. The show's ratings solidified, and it regularly landed in the top 20 rankings.

Cast

Main cast
 Dixie Carter as Julia Sugarbaker
 Annie Potts as Mary Jo Shively
 Delta Burke as Suzanne Sugarbaker
 Jean Smart as Charlene Frazier

Recurring cast
 Scott Bakula as Ted Shively
 Priscilla Weems as Claudia Shively
 Brian Lando as Quentin Shively
 George Newbern as Payne McIlroy
 Richard Gilliland as J.D. Shackleford
 Meshach Taylor as Anthony Bouvier
 Alice Ghostley as Bernice Clifton
 Hal Holbrook as Reese Watson

Guest cast

 Pamela Bowen as Marjorie Lee Winick
 Walter Olkewicz as Mason Dodd
 David Winn as Dane
 Natalia Nogulich as Primrose Horton
 Arlen Dean Snyder as Ray Don Simpson
 Louise Latham as Perky Sugarbaker
 Bobbie Ferguson as Monette Marlin
 Lisa Peluso as Shannon Gibbs

 Michael Ross as Gaylon King
 Ronnie Claire Edwards as Ione Frazier
 Andre Rosey Brown as Wendell Mack
 Justin Burnette as Harold Thomas Frazier
 Connie Chew as Li Sing
 Geoffrey Lewis as Dr. Davis Jackson
 Gregg Henry as Jack Dent
 Ted Leplat as Hence Winchester

Episodes

DVD release
The first season was released on DVD by Shout! Factory on May 26, 2009. Special features include the 2006 reunion bringing together the original cast mates and creator of the show, as well as a seven-page booklet written by Linda Bloodworth-Thomason introducing the series.

References

External links
 

Designing Women seasons
1986 American television seasons
1987 American television seasons